Typewriter is an Indian horror drama web television series, directed by Sujoy Ghosh, which stars Purab Kohli, Palomi Ghosh, Jisshu Sengupta and Sameer Kochhar in the lead roles. The series is set in Bardez township of Goa, and revolves around a haunted house and a book that captures the imagination of a group of wannabe ghost hunters.

It premiered on Netflix on 19 July 2019. The series was announced in November 2018.

Synopsis 
The story follows a group of children: Sameera (Sharma), Satyajit (Gandhi), and Devraj (Kamble), who live in Bardez, Goa. The inquisitive friends from a ghost club and decide to seek a ghost at an old haunted villa in their neighbourhood as their first mission. Their curiosity stems from an old story involving an old man who died in a novel called The Ghost of Sultanpore. However, before the children are able to discover a ghost, a new family moves in and the legend of the villa resurfaces in frightening intensity. The story revolves around the mystery behind the titular typewriter, which seems to harbor a grudge against those who try to remove it from the manor . It is further complicated by the narrative of past occupants, with the story jumping between decades. Sudden deaths, past of Sultanpore and unnatural powers are also the storylines of the webseries.

Cast and characters

Main
 Palomi Ghosh as Jenny Fernandes, mother of Nick and Anya
 Purab Kohli as Inspector Ravi Anand
 Jisshu Sengupta as Amit Roy, a mathematics teacher, faking as Roy, son of Fakeer. 
 Sameer Kochhar as Peter Fernandes, Jenny's husband
 Aarna Sharma as Sameera "Sam" Anand, Inspector Anand's daughter and the leader of the ghost club
 Aaryansh Malviya as Nikhil a.k.a. Nick, member of the ghost club
 Palash Kamble as Devraj "Bunty" Banerjee, member of the ghost club
 Mikhail Gandhi as Satyajit "Gablu" Tandon, member of the ghost club
 Sara Gesawat as Anya Fernandes, Jenny's daughter and a violinist

Recurring
 K C Shankar as Selwyn
 Bijou Thaangjam as Inspector Sushant
 Aliraza Namdar as Father Mason
 Harish Khanna as Moses
 Rinki Singhavi as Inspector Mira
 Sonali Sachdev as Charu, mother of Fakeer. She has paranormal powers within her.
Abhishek Banerjee as Fakeer, son of  Charu who inherited paranormal powers from his mother.
 Sumit Singh as Mr. Tandon, father of Gablu
 Kiran Ahuja as Mrs. Tandon, mother of Gablu
 Palash Dutta as Mr. Banerjee father of Bunty
 Debonita as Mrs. Banerjee, mother of Bunty
 Rammakant Daayama as Dr. Spirit, a fraud who claims to call spirits and ghosts

Guest stars
 Kanwaljit Singh as Madhav Matthew the ghost story writer. He died under suspicious circumstances. 
 Elli Avram as Anita 
 Meenacshi Martins as Maria Lopes, the maid
 Masood Akhtar as James Almeida, ex gardener of Madhav Matthew, owner of Goodhead bar
 Boloram Das as Harish (peon)
 Tulsi Das as Vacso Lopes
Shruthy Menon as Carol, Jenny's mother, who died under mysterious circumstances

Episodes

References

External links

Indian television series distributed by Netflix
2019 Indian television series debuts
2019 Indian television series endings
Indian horror fiction television series
Hindi-language Netflix original programming
Horror fiction web series